Cheviyorkkuka! Anthimakahalam (Listen! The Last Trumpet) is a book by Vaikom Muhammad Basheer published in 1992. The book includes the speech given by Basheer on the occasion of being conferred the Doctor of Letters (D. Litt.) by University of Calicut on 19 January 1987. It was the last book of Basheer published during his lifetime.

References

1992 non-fiction books
Indian non-fiction books
Books by Vaikom Muhammad Basheer
Malayalam-language books
1987 speeches
DC Books books
20th-century Indian books